UFC Fight Night: Stephens vs. Choi (also known as UFC Fight Night 124) was a mixed martial arts event produced by the Ultimate Fighting Championship held on January 14, 2018, at Scottrade Center in St. Louis, Missouri.

Background
The event marked the promotion's first visit to St. Louis. Former Zuffa subsidiary Strikeforce previously contested three events in the city, the most recent in December 2010.

The event was headlined by a featherweight bout between Jeremy Stephens and Choi Doo-ho.

A welterweight bout between Kamaru Usman and Emil Weber Meek was originally scheduled for UFC 219. However, due to an alleged visa issue for Meek which affected his travel schedule, the pairing was delayed and then rescheduled for UFC 220. However, on the next day, it was shifted to this event.

Zak Cummings was expected to face Thiago Alves at the event. However just two days before the bout, Cummings injured himself after falling and the bout was canceled.

At the weigh-ins, Mads Burnell weighed in at 150 pounds, 4 pounds over the featherweight non-title fight upper limit of 146 pounds. As such, the bout proceeded at a catchweight and Burnell forfeited 20% of his purse to his opponent Mike Santiago . Meanwhile, Uriah Hall did not weigh in as he fainted en route to the weigh-ins and his fight against former UFC Light Heavyweight Champion and UFC 12 Heavyweight Tournament winner Vitor Belfort was canceled.

Results

Bonus awards
The following fighters were awarded $50,000 bonuses:
Fight of the Night: Jeremy Stephens vs. Doo Ho Choi
Performance of the Night: Darren Elkins and Polo Reyes

See also 
List of UFC events
2018 in UFC
List of current UFC fighters

References

UFC Fight Night
Events in St. Louis
Mixed martial arts in Missouri
Sports competitions in St. Louis
2018 in mixed martial arts
January 2018 sports events in the United States